Crab Game is a free-to-play video game developed and published by Norwegian indie developer Daniel Sooman, known online as Dani. The game was released for Linux and macOS on Itch.io and for Windows on Steam on 29 October 2021; the Linux and macOS editions were later released on Steam on 16 November. Based on the Netflix series Squid Game, players compete with each other in a wide range of minigames in order to be the last one alive.

Gameplay
Crab Game is a first-person multiplayer party game where players compete in various minigames based around childhood games. The player must avoid dying and be the last one remaining in order to win a cash prize; however, the game ends if there is nobody left. Players can attack others with various items, compete in various maps and game modes and communicate with each other through proximity chat. Players can also create servers with up to 50 players or join existing ones. While the game initially featured primarily Squid Game-inspired minigames, a series of content updates have expanded the game to have a variety of game modes and maps unique to Crab Game, with no discernible connection to the series.

Developer 
Daniel William Sooman (born 15 June 1997), known online as Dani, is a comedic Norwegian YouTuber and an indie game developer. He is the developer of Crab Game. He also developed the open world game Muck and continues to develop the game Karlson 3D.

Career 
Dani started making programming and indie game development videos in 2018.

In late 2019, Sooman started the development of Karlson 3D prompted by commenters challenging him to do so. Development log videos that gained him the initial following on YouTube.

In late 2020, during the surge in popularity of the games Fall Guys and Among Us, Sooman challenged himself to recreate the viral games within the span of one week. The games were not released to the general public, but were made available to Twitch streamers and YouTubers. Following the release of his video on the recreation of Among Us in 3D, he appeared playing this game along with many other famous YouTubers like MrBeast, Dream and Jacksepticeye.

In June 2021, after getting a comment on his YouTube video that assumed he could make a open-world survival game, Sooman decided to create a Minecraft-styled, simplistic open world game titled Muck. The game was released on video game platform Steam.

In October 2021, Sooman released Crab Game. 

In April 2022, Sooman released a video on his second YouTube channel, Dani2, where he talks about how the growing pressure and expectations for Karlson has caused him to suffer from burn out, though he reassured his audience that he would finish Karlson some day.

Development and release
Crab Game was initially created in two weeks in response to Squid Game popularity and was named as such to avoid a cease and desist letter from Netflix. On 29 October 2021, Crab Game was released on Steam for Windows. The game was released on Itch.io for macOS and Linux as Dani was unsure of their stability due to not being able to test them; said editions were later released on Steam on 16 November. Since its release, Crab Game has been receiving content updates consisting of new maps, more games, and better optimization for slower computers or internet speeds.

Reception
Crab Game was well-received upon its initial release, reaching an all-time peak of over 56,000 players on Steam and over 211,000 viewers on Twitch. The game also quickly gained exposure on YouTube.

DDoS attacks
On 2 November 2021, Twitch streamer xQc experienced a DDoS attack while playing Crab Game, causing him to disconnect from the internet. Various Twitch streamers also experienced DDoS attacks, such as Sodapoppin and Nick Polom. Developer Dani confirmed the issues were caused by the old Steam networking code the game was using, which made the IP addresses of players public; he urged players to not join any public lobbies to prevent any DDoS attacks. The issue has since been fixed.

Awards

References 

Video games based on television series
2021 video games
Video games developed in Norway
Windows games
Free-to-play video games
Indie video games
Multiplayer online games
MacOS games
First-person video games
Linux games
Squid Game
Party video games